Pyrausta is a speciose genus of moths of the family Crambidae. The genus was erected by Franz von Paula Schrank in 1802.

Species
The genus includes the following species:

A

 Pyrausta acontialis (Staudinger, 1859)
 Pyrausta acrionalis (Walker, 1859)
 Pyrausta acrobasella Rebel, 1915
 Pyrausta adsocialis Zeller, 1852
 Pyrausta aerealis (Hübner, 1793)
 Pyrausta albescens Hampson, 1913
 Pyrausta albipedalis (Snellen, 1899)
 Pyrausta albogrisea Hampson, 1913
 Pyrausta alexandra Shodotova, 2010
 Pyrausta amatalis Rebel, 1903
 Pyrausta amboinalis (Pagenstecher, 1884)
 Pyrausta amelokalis (Viette, 1958)
 Pyrausta amiculatalis (Berg, 1876)
 Pyrausta anastasia Shodotova, 2010
 Pyrausta andrei Munroe, 1976
 Pyrausta ankaratralis Marion & Viette, 1956
 Pyrausta antisocialis Munroe, 1976
 Pyrausta apicalis (Hampson, 1913)
 Pyrausta approximalis (Guenée, 1854)
 Pyrausta arabica (Butler, 1884)
 Pyrausta arizonicalis Munroe, 1976
 Pyrausta armeniaca Slamka, 2013
 Pyrausta asopialis (Snellen, 1875)
 Pyrausta assutalis (Lederer, 1863)
 Pyrausta atrifusalis Hampson, 1903
 Pyrausta atropurpuralis (Grote, 1877)
 Pyrausta augustalis (C. Felder, R. Felder & Rogenhofer, 1875)
 Pyrausta aurata Scopoli, 1763
 Pyrausta aurea (Hampson, 1913)

B-C

 Pyrausta babalis (Amsel, 1970)
 Pyrausta bambucivora (Moore, 1888)
 Pyrausta benenotata (Swinhoe, 1894)
 Pyrausta bicoloralis (Guenée, 1854)
 Pyrausta bicornutalis Amsel, 1956
 Pyrausta bieti Oberthür, 1886
 Pyrausta bilineaterminalis Maes, 2009
 Pyrausta bisignata (Butler, 1889)
 Pyrausta bitincta Meyrick, 1932
 Pyrausta borealis Packard, 1867
 Pyrausta bostralis (Hampson, 1919)
 Pyrausta bouveti Viette, 1981
 Pyrausta californicalis (Packard, 1873)
 Pyrausta callidoralis (Oberthür, 1891)
 Pyrausta cardinalis (Guenée, 1854)
 Pyrausta carnifex (C. Felder, R. Felder & Rogenhofer, 1875)
 Pyrausta castalis Treitschke, 1829
 Pyrausta centralis Maes, 2009
 Pyrausta childrenalis (Boisduval, 1833)
 Pyrausta chilialis (C. Felder, R. Felder & Rogenhofer, 1875)
 Pyrausta chrysitis Butler, 1881
 Pyrausta chrysopygalis (Staudinger, 1900)
 Pyrausta chrysoterma Meyrick, 1933
 Pyrausta cingulata (Linnaeus, 1758)
 Pyrausta cinnamomealis (Wallengren, 1860)
 Pyrausta coactalis (Snellen, 1890)
 Pyrausta coccinea Warren, 1892
 Pyrausta coenalis Hampson, 1900
 Pyrausta comastis Meyrick, 1884
 Pyrausta contigualis South in Leech & South, 1901
 Pyrausta contristalis Caradja, 1932
 Pyrausta coracinalis Leraut, 1982
 Pyrausta corinthalis Barnes & McDunnough, 1914
 Pyrausta culminivola Caradja, 1939
 Pyrausta curvalis (Leech, 1889)

D-F

 Pyrausta dapalis (Grote, 1881)
 Pyrausta decetialis Druce, 1895
 Pyrausta deidamialis (Druce, 1895)
 Pyrausta delicatalis Caradja, 1916
 Pyrausta demantrialis (Druce, 1895)
 Pyrausta despicata (Scopoli, 1763)
 Pyrausta diatoma Hampson, 1913
 Pyrausta diplothaera Meyrick, 1936
 Pyrausta dissimulans Dyar, 1914
 Pyrausta distictalis Hampson, 1918
 Pyrausta draesekei Caradja, 1927
 Pyrausta ecteinalis Hampson, 1900
 Pyrausta elwesi (Staudinger, 1900)
 Pyrausta episcopalis (Herrich-Schäffer, 1871)
 Pyrausta euchromistes Dyar, 1918
 Pyrausta euergestalis (Amsel, 1954)
 Pyrausta euprepialis Hampson, 1903
 Pyrausta euralis Hampson, 1903
 Pyrausta euryphaea Meyrick, 1932
 Pyrausta facitalis (Berg, 1875)
 Pyrausta falcatalis Guenée, 1854
 Pyrausta ferrealis (Hampson, 1900)
 Pyrausta ferrifusalis (Hampson, 1893)
 Pyrausta fieldialis (Schaus, 1933)
 Pyrausta flavibrunnea Hampson, 1913
 Pyrausta flavibrunnealis Hampson, 1908
 Pyrausta flavicollalis Hampson, 1913
 Pyrausta flavidiscata Hampson, 1913
 Pyrausta flavimarginalis (Hampson, 1913)
 Pyrausta flavofascialis (Grote, 1882)
 Pyrausta flavipunctalis (Marion, 1954)
 Pyrausta fodinalis (Lederer, 1863)
 Pyrausta fuliginata Yamanaka, 1978
 Pyrausta fulvalis (Dognin, 1908)
 Pyrausta fulvilinealis Hampson, 1918
 Pyrausta fulvitinctalis Hampson, 1918
 Pyrausta furvicoloralis Hampson, 1900

G-K

 Pyrausta gazalis Hampson, 1913
 Pyrausta gemmiferalis (Zeller, 1852)
 Pyrausta generosa (Grote & Robinson, 1867)
 Pyrausta genialis South in Leech & South, 1901
 Pyrausta gentillalis Schaus, 1940
 Pyrausta germanalis (Herrich-Schäffer, 1871)
 Pyrausta gracilalis (Herrich-Schäffer, 1871)
 Pyrausta grisealis Maes, 2009
 Pyrausta griseocilialis South in Leech & South, 1901
 Pyrausta griseofumalis Hampson, 1900
 Pyrausta griveaudalis Viette, 1978
 Pyrausta grotei (Munroe, 1976)
 Pyrausta haemapastalis Hampson, 1908
 Pyrausta haematidalis Hampson, 1913
 Pyrausta hampsoni South in Leech & South, 1901
 Pyrausta heliacalis (C. Felder, R. Felder & Rogenhofer, 1875)
 Pyrausta heliothidia Hampson, 1913
 Pyrausta homonymalis (Walker, 1866)
 Pyrausta ictericalis (Snellen, 1895)
 Pyrausta idonealis (Herrich-Schäffer, 1871)
 Pyrausta ignealis (Hampson, 1899)
 Pyrausta ilithucialis (Walker, 1859)
 Pyrausta illiberalis (Hübner, 1823)
 Pyrausta infuscalis Hampson, 1918
 Pyrausta inglorialis (Hampson, 1900)
 Pyrausta inornatalis (Fernald, 1885)
 Pyrausta insequalis (Guenée, 1854)
 Pyrausta insignitalis (Guenée, 1854)
 Pyrausta insularis (Grote & Robinson, 1867)
 Pyrausta interfixalis (Walker, 1869)
 Pyrausta internexalis (Dognin, 1905)
 Pyrausta inveterascalis Barnes & McDunnough, 1918
 Pyrausta issykkulensis (Sauber, 1899)
 Pyrausta kandalis Viette, 1989
 Pyrausta klotsi Munroe, 1976

L-N

 Pyrausta lambomakandroalis Viette, 1954
 Pyrausta laresalis Schaus, 1940
 Pyrausta laristanalis Amsel, 1961
 Pyrausta laticlavia (Grote & Robinson, 1867)
 Pyrausta leechi South in Leech & South, 1901
 Pyrausta lethalis (Grote, 1881)
 Pyrausta limbata (Butler, 1879)
 Pyrausta limbopunctalis (Herrich-Schäffer, 1849)
 Pyrausta linealis (Fernald, 1894)
 Pyrausta louvinia Clarke, 1965
 Pyrausta maenialis Oberthür, 1894
 Pyrausta mandarinalis South in Leech & South, 1901
 Pyrausta marginepunctalis Gaede, 1916
 Pyrausta melaleucalis (Eversmann, 1852)
 Pyrausta melanocera Hampson, 1913
 Pyrausta metasialis Hampson, 1912
 Pyrausta microdontalis Hampson, 1912
 Pyrausta microdontaloides Maes, 2009
 Pyrausta minimalis Hampson, 1903
 Pyrausta mitis (Butler, 1883)
 Pyrausta monosema Hampson, 1912
 Pyrausta morelensis Lopez & Beutelspacher, 1986
 Pyrausta morenalis (Dyar, 1908)
 Pyrausta moupinalis South in Leech & South, 1901
 Pyrausta mystica Caradja, 1932
 Pyrausta napaealis (Hulst, 1886)
 Pyrausta nexalis (Hulst, 1886)
 Pyrausta nicalis (Grote, 1878)
 Pyrausta nigrata Scopoli, 1763
 Pyrausta nigrimaculata Y.S. Bae & Y.K. Kim, 2002
 Pyrausta niveicilialis (Grote, 1875)
 Pyrausta noctualis Yamanaka, 1978
 Pyrausta nugalis (Snellen, 1899)

O-P

 Pyrausta oberthuri South in Leech & South, 1901
 Pyrausta obfuscata Scopoli, 1763
 Pyrausta obscurior Caradja, 1938
 Pyrausta obstipalis South in Leech & South, 1901
 Pyrausta obtusanalis Druce, 1899
 Pyrausta occidentalis (Snellen, 1887)
 Pyrausta ochracealis Walker, 1866
 Pyrausta ochreicostalis Barnes & McDunnough, 1918
 Pyrausta odontogrammalis Caradja, 1925
 Pyrausta oenochrois (Meyrick, 1889)
 Pyrausta omicronalis (Snellen, 1880)
 Pyrausta onythesalis (Walker, 1859)
 Pyrausta orphisalis Walker, 1859
 Pyrausta ostrinalis (Hübner, 1796)
 Pyrausta pachyceralis Hampson, 1900
 Pyrausta paghmanalis (Amsel, 1970)
 Pyrausta pastrinalis (Guenée, 1862)
 Pyrausta pauperalis (Staudinger, 1879)
 Pyrausta pavidalis Zerny in Osthelder, 1935
 Pyrausta pectinalis Hampson, 1918
 Pyrausta pellicalis (Staudinger, 1870)
 Pyrausta perkeo Amsel, 1970
 Pyrausta perlalis (Maassen)
 Pyrausta perlelegans Hampson, 1898
 Pyrausta perparvula Maes, 2009
 Pyrausta perrubralis (Packard, 1873)
 Pyrausta persimilis Caradja, 1932
 Pyrausta peyrieralis Viette, 1978
 Pyrausta phaeochysis (Hampson, 1899)
 Pyrausta phaeophoenica Hampson, 1899
 Pyrausta phoenicealis (Hübner, 1818)
 Pyrausta phragmatidalis Hampson, 1908
 Pyrausta pilatealis Barnes & McDunnough, 1914
 Pyrausta pionalis Toll, 1948
 Pyrausta plagalis Haimbach, 1908
 Pyrausta plinthinalis Swinhoe, 1907
 Pyrausta ploimalis Dyar, 1914
 Pyrausta polygamalis (Snellen, 1875)
 Pyrausta porphyralis (Denis & Schiffermüller, 1775)
 Pyrausta postalbalis South in Leech & South, 1901
 Pyrausta postaperta Dyar, 1914
 Pyrausta posticalis Saalmüller, 1880
 Pyrausta prochytalis (Druce, 1895)
 Pyrausta pseuderosnealis Munroe, 1976
 Pyrausta pseudonythesalis Munroe, 1976
 Pyrausta pulchripictalis (Hampson, 1895)
 Pyrausta punctilinealis South in Leech & South, 1901
 Pyrausta purpuralis (Linnaeus, 1758)
 Pyrausta purpuraria (Butler, 1883)
 Pyrausta pygmealis South in Leech & South, 1901
 Pyrausta pyrocausta Hampson, 1899
 Pyrausta pythialis Barnes & McDunnough, 1918

Q-S

 Pyrausta quadrimaculalis South in Leech & South, 1901
 Pyrausta quadrimaculalis (Dognin, 1908)
 Pyrausta rectifascialis (Sauber, 1899)
 Pyrausta retidiscalis Munroe, 1976
 Pyrausta rhipheusalis (Walker, 1859)
 Pyrausta rhodoxantha Hampson, 1913
 Pyrausta roseivestalis Munroe, 1976
 Pyrausta rubellalis (Snellen, 1890)
 Pyrausta rubescentalis Hampson, 1913
 Pyrausta rubralis (Warren, 1896)
 Pyrausta rubricalis Hübner, 1796
 Pyrausta rueckbeili (Sauber, 1899)
 Pyrausta rufalis South in Leech & South, 1901
 Pyrausta salvia (Druce, 1895)
 Pyrausta sanguifusalis Hampson, 1913
 Pyrausta sanguinalis (Linnaeus, 1767)
 Pyrausta sarobialis (Amsel, 1970)
 Pyrausta sartoralis Barnes & McDunnough, 1914
 Pyrausta scurralis (Hulst, 1886)
 Pyrausta semirubralis (Packard, 1873)
 Pyrausta sexplagialis Gaede, 1917
 Pyrausta shirleyae Munroe, 1976
 Pyrausta signatalis (Walker, 1866)
 Pyrausta sikkima Moore, 1888
 Pyrausta silhetalis Guenée, 1854
 Pyrausta socialis (Grote, 1877)
 Pyrausta splendida Caradja, 1938
 Pyrausta staiusalis (Walker, 1859)
 Pyrausta sthenialis Hampson in Poulton, 1916
 Pyrausta stigmatalis (Sepp, 1855)
 Pyrausta strigatalis Caradja in Caradja & Meyrick, 1937
 Pyrausta suavidalis (Berg, 1899)
 Pyrausta subcrocealis (Snellen, 1880)
 Pyrausta subflavalis (Warren, 1892)
 Pyrausta subfuscalis Caradja in Caradja & Meyrick, 1933
 Pyrausta subgenerosa Munroe, 1976
 Pyrausta subinquinalis (Guenée, 1854)
 Pyrausta subsequalis (Guenée, 1854)
 Pyrausta subviolalis (Herrich-Schäffer, 1871)
 Pyrausta sumptuosalis Caradja, 1927
 Pyrausta surinamensis (Sepp, 1882)
 Pyrausta syfanialis (Oberthür, 1893)
 Pyrausta syntomidalis (Viette, 1960)
 Pyrausta szetschwanalis Caradja, 1927

T-Z

 Pyrausta tapaishanensis Caradja, 1939
 Pyrausta tatalis (Grote, 1877)
 Pyrausta tenuilinea Hampson, 1913
 Pyrausta terminalis Wileman & South, 1917
 Pyrausta tetraplagalis Hampson, 1899
 Pyrausta theialis (Walker, 1859)
 Pyrausta thibetalis Oberthür, 1886
 Pyrausta tinctalis Lederer, 1863
 Pyrausta tithonialis (Zeller, 1872)
 Pyrausta tortualis South in Leech & South, 1901
 Pyrausta trimaculalis (Staudinger, 1867)
 Pyrausta triphaenalis (Snellen, 1901)
 Pyrausta tripunctalis Dognin, 1908
 Pyrausta trizonalis Hampson, 1899
 Pyrausta tschelialis Caradja, 1927
 Pyrausta tuolumnalis Barnes & McDunnough, 1918
 Pyrausta tyralis (Guenée, 1854)
 Pyrausta unifascialis (Packard, 1873)
 Pyrausta unipunctata Butler, 1881
 Pyrausta vanalis (C. Felder, R. Felder & Rogenhofer, 1875)
 Pyrausta variegalis (Snellen, 1875)
 Pyrausta venilialis (Mabille, 1880)
 Pyrausta vicarialis (Snellen, 1875)
 Pyrausta viola Butler, 1882
 Pyrausta violascens Hampson, 1918
 Pyrausta virginalis Duponchel, 1832
 Pyrausta volupialis (Grote, 1877)
 Pyrausta votanalis Schaus, 1940
 Pyrausta xanthomela (Hampson, 1913)
 Pyrausta zeitunalis Caradja, 1916
 Pyrausta zonalis Barnes & McDunnough, 1918

Former species
The following species were formerly included in this genus:

 Pyrausta atricinctalis Hampson, 1913
 Pyrausta aurea (Hampson, 1913)
 Pyrausta chrysocarpa Meyrick, 1937
 Pyrausta coccinealis
 Pyrausta delicatalis Caradja, 1916
 Pyrausta eriopisalis (Walker, 1859)
 Pyrausta funeralis Zerny, 1914
 Pyrausta incensalis (Lederer, 1863)
 Pyrausta intermedialis Caradja, 1916
 Pyrausta jatrophalis
 Pyrausta julialis (Walker, 1859)
 Pyrausta kukunorensis (Sauber, 1899)
 Pyrausta labordalis Viette, 1958
 Pyrausta mahensis T. B. Fletcher, 1910
 Pyrausta meciti Koçak, 1987
 Pyrausta nerialis (Boisduval, 1833)
 Pyrausta panopealis (Walker, 1859)
 Pyrausta patagoniensis
 Pyrausta procillusalis (Walker, 1859)
 Pyrausta pulvereiumbralis Hampson, 1918
 Pyrausta rufilinealis Hampson, 1910
 Pyrausta semilimbalis Mabille, 1900
 Pyrausta similis (Amsel, 1970)
 Pyrausta suisharyonalis Strand, 1918
 Pyrausta triselena Meyrick, 1937
 Pyrausta xanthothysana Hampson, 1903

Status unclear
 Pyrausta argyralis (O.-G. Costa, 1836), described as Botys argyralis from Italy.
 Pyrausta venalalis (Hulst, 1886), described as Botys venalalis from New York.

References

 

 
Crambidae genera
Pyraustinae
Taxa named by Franz von Paula Schrank